The Northern League (LN, Lega Nord) was the first football league in Italy.

The League 
The League born in summer 1921 in opposition to the Italian Football Federation. The greatest and richest clubs of Northern Italy unsuccessfully asked for a reform of the amatorial and crowded Italian Football Championship. The 24 major clubs consequently resigned from the FIGC and founded the Northern League on the model of the English Football League. The headquarters were in Milan. They created their own private championship, the First Division, that received also the adhesion of all Southern clubs, that were united into a Southern League, and of some minor clubs that were grouped into a Second Division. Together, they created the Italian Football Confederation in opposition to the Federation.

The lack of international recognition by the FIFA suggested an agreement with the poor FIGC, under mediation of the Gazzetta dello Sport director, Mr Colombo. The FIGC accepted the First Division as its new major competition, and the CCI was disbanded. The clubs of the old FIGC First Category which were excluded from the First Division joined the Northern League into a new competition, the Second Division.

The Northern League was disbanded by the fascists in 1926. They transformed the league into a national appointed committee, the Higher Directory. After the war and the fall of fascism, the Football League was restored with a national structure. In 2010, the Football League was transformed into present-day Lega Serie A.

References 

Serie A
Football in Italy
1921 establishments in Italy
1926 disestablishments in Italy